Elias Sunde (2 October 1851 in Flekkefjord – 2 July 1910) was a Norwegian politician from the Liberal Party who served as Minister of Finance 1898–1900 and 1900–1903, and member of the Council of State Division in Stockholm from 1900-1901. He was also the mayor of Oslo from 1895 to 1897. He was the father of justice minister Arne Sunde.

References

1851 births
1910 deaths
Government ministers of Norway
Mayors of Oslo
People from Flekkefjord
Place of death missing
Ministers of Finance of Norway